Prey Chas is a khum (commune) of Aek Phnum District in Battambang Province in north-western Cambodia.

Villages

 Prey Chas
 Peam Seima
 Anlong Sandan
 Kaoh Chiveang
 Bak Prea

References

Communes of Battambang province
Aek Phnum District